Crataegus ellwangeriana is a named hawthorn species that has been poorly understood and often misidentified. It is now considered to be a synonym of C. coccinea var. coccinea. A study concluded, that C. pennsylvanica of series Molles has frequently been misidentified as C. ellwangeriana.

References

ellwangeriana
Flora of North America